Fieldsboro is a borough in Burlington County, in the U.S. state of New Jersey. As of the 2020 United States census, the borough's population was 526, a decrease of 14 (−2.6%) from the 2010 census count of 540, which in turn reflected an increase of 18 (+3.4%) from the 522 counted in the 2000 census.

Fieldsboro was incorporated as a borough by an act of the New Jersey Legislature as Fieldsborough on March 7, 1850, within portions of Mansfield Township. It separated from Bordentown Township as an independent municipality  1894. The borough was named for the Field family, prominent early settlers in the area.

Geography
According to the United States Census Bureau, the borough had a total area of 0.36 square miles (0.93 km2), including 0.28 square miles (0.72 km2) of land and 0.08 square miles (0.21 km2) of water (22.22%).

The borough borders Bordentown Township and the Delaware River.

Demographics

2010 census

The Census Bureau's 2006–2010 American Community Survey showed that (in 2010 inflation-adjusted dollars) median household income was $60,938 (with a margin of error of +/− $19,968) and the median family income was $67,500 (+/− $22,306). Males had a median income of $68,750 (+/− $47,669) versus $48,500 (+/− $14,355) for females. The per capita income for the borough was $30,284 (+/− $8,796). About none of families and 1.0% of the population were below the poverty line, including 2.1% of those under age 18 and none of those age 65 or over.

2000 census
As of the 2000 United States census there were 522 people, 189 households, and 138 families residing in the borough. The racial makeup of the borough was 81.61% White, 15.90% African American, 0.19% Native American, 0.38% from other races, and 1.92% from two or more races. Hispanic or Latino of any race were 2.49% of the population.

There were 189 households, out of which 34.9% had children under the age of 18 living with them, 51.3% were married couples living together, 16.9% had a female householder with no husband present, and 26.5% were non-families. 17.5% of all households were made up of individuals, and 5.8% had someone living alone who was 65 years of age or older. The average household size was 2.76 and the average family size was 3.17.

In the borough the population was spread out, with 25.3% under the age of 18, 6.7% from 18 to 24, 38.3% from 25 to 44, 17.2% from 45 to 64, and 12.5% who were 65 years of age or older. The median age was 35 years. For every 100 females, there were 88.4 males. For every 100 females age 18 and over, there were 94.0 males.

The median income for a household in the borough was $58,958, and the median income for a family was $66,607. Males had a median income of $41,932 versus $35,625 for females. The per capita income for the borough was $23,908. About 2.1% of families and 1.9% of the population were below the poverty line, including 0.7% of those under age 18 and none of those age 65 or over.

Government

Local government
Fieldsboro is governed under the Borough form of New Jersey municipal government, which is used in 218 (of the 564) municipalities statewide, making it the most common form of government in New Jersey. The governing body is comprised of a Mayor and a Borough Council, with all positions elected at-large on a partisan basis as part of the November general election. A Mayor is elected directly by the voters to a four-year term of office. The Borough Council is comprised of six members elected to serve three-year terms on a staggered basis, with two seats coming up for election each year in a three-year cycle. The Borough form of government used by Fieldsboro is a "weak mayor / strong council" government in which council members act as the legislative body with the mayor presiding at meetings and voting only in the event of a tie. The mayor can veto ordinances subject to an override by a two-thirds majority vote of the council. The mayor makes committee and liaison assignments for council members, and most appointments are made by the mayor with the advice and consent of the council.

, the mayor of Fieldsboro is Democrat David R. Hansell, whose term of office ends December 31, 2025. Members of the Borough Council are Richard Lynch (D, 2022), Charlene Lewis (D, 2023), Jonathan B. Norcross (D, 2023), Timothy D. Tyler (R, 2024), Rosemarie Weaver (D, 2022) and Andrew Weber (D, 2024).

In 2015, the borough disbanded its police force and reached an agreement with Bordentown City to provide police coverage in the borough as a shared service at a cost of $28,000 per year, less than half the cost to Fieldsboro for its three-man force.

In February 2012, the council selected Jonathan Norcross to fill the vacancy on the borough council that had been created when David Hansell became mayor. Hansell had been appointed as mayor to fill the vacancy of Buddy Tyler following his death in November 2011.

Federal, state and county representation
Fieldsboro is located in the 3rd Congressional District and is part of New Jersey's 7th state legislative district. Prior to the 2011 reapportionment following the 2010 Census, Fieldsboro had been in the 30th state legislative district.

 

Burlington County is governed by a Board of County Commissioners comprised of five members who are chosen at-large in partisan elections to serve three-year terms of office on a staggered basis, with either one or two seats coming up for election each year; at an annual reorganization meeting, the board selects a director and deputy director from among its members to serve a one-year term. , Burlington County's Commissioners are
Director Felicia Hopson (D, Willingboro Township, term as commissioner ends December 31, 2024; term as director ends 2023),
Deputy Director Tom Pullion (D, Edgewater Park, term as commissioner and as deputy director ends 2023),
Allison Eckel (D, Medford, 2025),
Daniel J. O'Connell (D, Delran Township, 2024) and 
Balvir Singh (D, Burlington Township, 2023). 
Burlington County's Constitutional Officers are
County Clerk Joanne Schwartz (R, Southampton Township, 2023)
Sheriff James H. Kostoplis (D, Bordentown, 2025) and 
Surrogate Brian J. Carlin (D, Burlington Township, 2026).

Politics
As of March 2011, there were a total of 350 registered voters in Fieldsboro, of which 183 (52.3% vs. 33.3% countywide) were registered as Democrats, 49 (14.0% vs. 23.9%) were registered as Republicans and 118 (33.7% vs. 42.8%) were registered as Unaffiliated. There were no voters registered to other parties. Among the borough's 2010 Census population, 64.8% (vs. 61.7% in Burlington County) were registered to vote, including 86.4% of those ages 18 and over (vs. 80.3% countywide).

In the 2012 presidential election, Democrat Barack Obama received 175 votes (66.5% vs. 58.1% countywide), ahead of Republican Mitt Romney with 79 votes (30.0% vs. 40.2%) and other candidates with 7 votes (2.7% vs. 1.0%), among the 263 ballots cast by the borough's 359 registered voters, for a turnout of 73.3% (vs. 74.5% in Burlington County). In the 2008 presidential election, Democrat Barack Obama received 200 votes (66.0% vs. 58.4% countywide), ahead of Republican John McCain with 90 votes (29.7% vs. 39.9%) and other candidates with 10 votes (3.3% vs. 1.0%), among the 303 ballots cast by the borough's 376 registered voters, for a turnout of 80.6% (vs. 80.0% in Burlington County). In the 2004 presidential election, Democrat John Kerry received 153 votes (57.5% vs. 52.9% countywide), ahead of Republican George W. Bush with 108 votes (40.6% vs. 46.0%) and other candidates with 4 votes (1.5% vs. 0.8%), among the 266 ballots cast by the borough's 362 registered voters, for a turnout of 73.5% (vs. 78.8% in the whole county).

In the 2013 gubernatorial election, Republican Chris Christie received 90 votes (50.8% vs. 61.4% countywide), ahead of Democrat Barbara Buono with 77 votes (43.5% vs. 35.8%) and other candidates with 6 votes (3.4% vs. 1.2%), among the 177 ballots cast by the borough's 360 registered voters, yielding a 49.2% turnout (vs. 44.5% in the county). In the 2009 gubernatorial election, Democrat Jon Corzine received 124 ballots cast (52.3% vs. 44.5% countywide), ahead of Republican Chris Christie with 81 votes (34.2% vs. 47.7%), Independent Chris Daggett with 11 votes (4.6% vs. 4.8%) and other candidates with 8 votes (3.4% vs. 1.2%), among the 237 ballots cast by the borough's 363 registered voters, yielding a 65.3% turnout (vs. 44.9% in the county).

Education
Students in public school for kindergarten through twelfth grade attend the schools of the Bordentown Regional School District, which also serves students from Bordentown City and Bordentown Township. As of the 2020–21 school year, the district, comprised of five schools, had an enrollment of 2,373 students and 194.0 classroom teachers (on an FTE basis), for a student–teacher ratio of 12.2:1. Schools in the district (with 2020–21 enrollment data from the National Center for Education Statistics) are 
Clara Barton Elementary School with 235 students in grades K–2 (generally serves Bordentown City and the Holloway Meadows section of Bordentown Township), 
Peter Muschal Elementary School with 522 students in grades Pre-K–5 (generally serves remainder of Bordentown Township and the Borough of Fieldsboro), 
MacFarland Intermediate School with 243 students in grades 3–5, 
Bordentown Regional Middle School with 576 students in grades 6–8 and 
Bordentown Regional High School with 766 students in grades 9–12.  The district's board of education is comprised of nine members, who are elected directly by voters to serve three-year terms of office on a staggered basis, with three seats up for election each year. The board's nine seats are allocated based on the population of the constituent municipalities, with one seat assigned to Fieldsboro.

The New Hanover Township School District, consisting of New Hanover Township (including its Cookstown area) and Wrightstown Borough, sends students to Bordentown Regional High School on a tuition basis for grades 9–12 as part of a sending/receiving relationship that has been in place since the 1960s, with about 50 students from the New Hanover district being sent to the high school. As of 2011, the New Hanover district was considering expansion of its relationship to send students to Bordentown for middle school for grades 6–8.

Students from Fieldsboro, and from all of Burlington County, are eligible to attend the Burlington County Institute of Technology, a countywide public school district that serves the vocational and technical education needs of students at the high school and post-secondary level at its campuses in Medford and Westampton Township.

Transportation

Roads and highways

County Route 662 is the main road through Fieldsboro. No major county, state, U.S. or interstate passes through the borough. U.S. Route 130 is the closest major road to the borough. Other roads that are accessible in neighboring Bordentown Township are Interstate 295, U.S. Route 206 and the New Jersey Turnpike.

Public transportation
NJ Transit provides bus service in the borough between Trenton and Philadelphia on the 409 route.

Notable people

People who were born in, residents of, or otherwise closely associated with Bordentown include:

 Len Boone, singer, songwriter and multi-instrumentalist
 Archibald Crossley (1896–1985), pollster, statistician and pioneer in public opinion research

References

External links

 
1850 establishments in New Jersey
Borough form of New Jersey government
Boroughs in Burlington County, New Jersey
Populated places established in 1850
New Jersey populated places on the Delaware River